Lebap Region Mosque or Lebap welaýatynyň baş metji is a mosque in Türkmenabat, Turkmenistan, the main mosque of Lebap Region. The mosque accommodates up to 3,000 worshipers at a time and is located on Bitarap Turkmenistan street.

History 
The foundation-laying ceremony took place in June 2015.

It was inaugurated by Gurbanguly Berdimuhamedov, the president of Turkmenistan, on 21 February 2020.

Architecture 
There is also a room for a sadaka for 500 people, a hotel for 50 people and a parking.

The central dome of the mosque is crowned with a golden crescent. The architectural complex also includes four slender minarets decorated with original decor elements.

References

2020s establishments in Turkmenistan
Mosques completed in 2020
Mosques in Turkmenistan